Lec foetidum is a species of bolete fungus in the family Boletaceae. Found in the Democratic Republic of the Congo, it was described as new to science in 1964 by French mycologist Paul Heinemann.

See also
List of Leccinum species

References

foetidum
Fungi described in 1964
Fungi of Africa